This article refers to sports broadcasting contracts in Kosovo. For a list of broadcasting rights in other countries, see Sports television broadcast contracts.

Sport Channels

Part of Kujtesa
K Sport 1 (HD 720p 50FPS)
K Sport 2 (HD 720p 50FPS)
K Sport 3 (HD 720p 50FPS)
K Sport 4 (HD 720p 50FPS)
K Sport 5 (HD 720p 50FPS)
ArtSport 1 (FHD 1080i)
ArtSport 2 (FHD 1080i)
ArtSport 3 (FHD 1080i)
ArtSport 4 (FHD 1080i)
ArtSport 5 (FHD 1080i)
ArtSport 6 (FHD 1080i)
SuperSport Kosova 1 (FHD 1080i)
SuperSport Kosova 2 (FHD 1080i)
SuperSport Kosova 3 (FHD 1080i)
SuperSport Albania 1 (FHD 1080i)
SuperSport Albania 2 (FHD 1080i)
SuperSport Albania 3 (FHD 1080i)
SuperSport Albania 4 (FHD 1080i)
SuperSport Albania 5 (FHD 1080i)
SuperSport Albania 6 (FHD 1080i)
SuperSport Albania 7 (FHD 1080i)
Eurosport 1 (FHD 1080i)
Eurosport 2 (FHD 1080i)
NBA TV (FHD 1080i)
LFC TV (FHD 1080i)
TRT Spor (SD)
Extreme Sports Channel (SD)
FightBox (SD)
Fast and Fun Box (FHD 1080i)
GameToon (SD)
Arena Premium 1 (FHD 1080i)
Arena Premium 2 (FHD 1080i)
Arena Premium 3 (FHD 1080i)
Arena Sport 1 (FHD 1080i)
Arena Sport 2 (FHD 1080i)
Arena Sport 3 (FHD 1080i)
Arena Sport 4 (FHD 1080i)
Arena Sport 5 (FHD 1080i)
Arena eSport (FHD 1080i)
Arena Fight (FHD 1080i)

Part of ArtMotion
ArtSport 1 (FHD 1080i)
ArtSport 2 (FHD 1080i)
ArtSport 3 (FHD 1080i)
ArtSport 4 (FHD 1080i)
ArtSport 5 (FHD 1080i)
ArtSport 6 (FHD 1080i)
K Sport 1 (HD 720p 50FPS)
K Sport 2 (HD 720p 50FPS)
K Sport 3 (HD 720p 50FPS)
K Sport 4 (HD 720p 50FPS)
K Sport 5 (HD 720p 50FPS)
SuperSport Kosova 1 (FHD 1080i)
SuperSport Kosova 2 (FHD 1080i)
SuperSport Kosova 3 (FHD 1080i)
SuperSport Albania 1 (FHD 1080i)
SuperSport Albania 2 (FHD 1080i)
SuperSport Albania 3 (FHD 1080i)
SuperSport Albania 4 (FHD 1080i)
SuperSport Albania 5 (FHD 1080i)
SuperSport Albania 6 (FHD 1080i)
SuperSport Albania 7 (FHD 1080i)
Eurosport 1 (FHD 1080i)
Eurosport 2 (FHD 1080i)
NBA TV (FHD 1080i)
LFC TV (FHD 1080i)
TRT Spor (SD)
FightBox (SD)
Fast and Fun Box (FHD 1080i)
GameToon (SD)
Extreme Sports Channel (SD)
Outdoor Channel (FHD 1080i)
Arena Premium 1 (FHD 1080i)
Arena Premium 2 (FHD 1080i)
Arena Premium 3 (FHD 1080i)
Arena Sport 1 (FHD 1080i)
Arena Sport 2 (FHD 1080i)
Arena Sport 3 (FHD 1080i)
Arena Sport 4 (FHD 1080i)
Arena Sport 5 (FHD 1080i)
Arena eSport (FHD 1080i)
Arena Fight (FHD 1080i)

Part of TiBO & Oversport, ISP Broadcast, KadriaNet, Vala TV
Oversport News (FHD 1080i)
Oversport 1 (FHD 1080i)
Oversport 2 (FHD 1080i)
Oversport 3 (FHD 1080i)
Oversport 4 (FHD 1080i)
Oversport 5 (FHD 1080i)
Oversport 4K (COMING SOON)

Part of TelKos
Oversport News (FHD 1080i)
Oversport 1 (FHD 1080i)
Oversport 2 (FHD 1080i)
Oversport 3 (FHD 1080i)
Oversport 4 (FHD 1080i)
Oversport 5 (FHD 1080i)
ArtSport 1 (FHD 1080i)
ArtSport 2 (FHD 1080i)
ArtSport 3 (FHD 1080i)
ArtSport 4 (FHD 1080i)
ArtSport 5 (FHD 1080i)
ArtSport 6 (FHD 1080i)
K Sport 1 (HD 720p 50FPS)
K Sport 2 (HD 720p 50FPS)
K Sport 3 (HD 720p 50FPS)
K Sport 4 (HD 720p 50FPS)
K Sport 5 (HD 720p 50FPS)
Arena Premium 1 (FHD 1080i)
Arena Premium 2 (FHD 1080i)
Arena Premium 3 (FHD 1080i)
Arena Sport 1 (FHD 1080i)
Arena Sport 2 (FHD 1080i)
Arena Sport 3 (FHD 1080i)
Arena Sport 4 (FHD 1080i)
Arena Sport 5 (FHD 1080i)
Arena eSport (FHD 1080i)
Arena Fight (FHD 1080i)
NBA TV (FHD 1080i)
LFC TV (FHD 1080i)

Part of RTK
RTK 1 (SD & FHD 1080i)
RTK 2 (SD & FHD 1080i) (serbian language)
RTK 3 (SD & FHD 1080i) (24h NEWS) 
RTK 4 (SD & FHD 1080i) (Sport, Kids, Art, Music & Documentaries)

Part of RTSH
 RTSH 1 (SD & FHD 1080i)
 RTSH 2 (SD)
 RTSH 3 (SD)
 RTSH Sport (SD)

Part of IPKO
ArtSport 1 (FHD 1080i)
ArtSport 2 (FHD 1080i)
ArtSport 3 (FHD 1080i)
ArtSport 4 (FHD 1080i)
ArtSport 5 (FHD 1080i)
ArtSport 6 (FHD 1080i)
K Sport 1 (HD 720p 50FPS)
K Sport 2 (HD 720p 50FPS)
K Sport 3 (HD 720p 50FPS)
K Sport 4 (HD 720p 50FPS)
K Sport 5 (HD 720p 50FPS)
NBA TV (FHD 1080i)
TRT Spor (SD)
A Spor (SD)
Arena Premium 1 (FHD 1080i)
Arena Premium 2 (FHD 1080i)
Arena Premium 3 (FHD 1080i)
Arena Sport 1 (FHD 1080i)
Arena Sport 2 (FHD 1080i)
Arena Sport 3 (FHD 1080i)
Arena Sport 4 (FHD 1080i)
Arena Sport 5 (FHD 1080i)
Arena eSport (FHD 1080i)
Arena Fight (FHD 1080i)

Olympic Games
2016 Summer Olympics
RTK
SuperSport
2019 European Games: RTK
2020 Summer Olympics
RTK
Eurosport
2022 Winter Olympics
RTK
Eurosport
2024 Summer Olympics: RTK

Football

National teams 

FIFA World Cup: RTK (2010 - 2014 - 2018 -2022)
UEFA Nations League
SuperSport (2018/2027)
ArtSport (2022/2027)
Klan Kosova (only Kosovo NT games)
RTL (only Germany NT games on German language)
TRT (only Turkey NT games on Turkish language)
2022 FIFA World Cup qualification (UEFA)
SuperSport
RTK (only Kosovo NT games)
2022 FIFA World Cup qualification (CONMEBOL): RTK
2023 FIFA Women's World Cup: RTK
2022 Finalissima
SuperSport
ArtSport
2022 UEFA EURO U-19: RTSH
2022 FIFA U-17 Women's World Cup: RTSH
2023 FIFA Women's World Cup qualification: RTK (Only Kosovo WNT matches)
UEFA Euro 2024 qualifying: SuperSport
UEFA Euro 2024: ArtSport
UEFA Euro 2028 qualifying: SuperSport
UEFA Euro 2028: ArtSport
 2025 Finalissima: ArtSport
2026 FIFA World Cup qualification: SuperSport

Clubs

Leagues

UEFA Champions League
ArtSport (2021/2027)
Klan Kosova (only one Wednesday match + Final)
RTK (Free-To-Air wednesday best pick 2024/2027)
UEFA Europa League
ArtSport (2021/2027)
RTK (Free-To-Air 1 match 2024/2027)
UEFA Conference League
ArtSport (2021/2027)
Klan Kosova (2022 Final + Kosovar club(s) only)
RTK (Free-To-Air 1 match 2024/2027)
UEFA Youth League: ArtSport (2021/2024)
Premier League: SuperSport  (2016/2025)
EFL Championship: ArtSport (2022/2024)
La Liga
ArtSport
K Sport (2021/2026)
La Liga 2
ArtSport (2021/2026)
K Sport
Serie A
Oversport (2021/2024)
Ligue 1
ArtSport (2021/2024)
K Sport (2021/2024)
Ligue 2
SuperSport (2022/2024)
Bundesliga
SuperSport (2021/2025)
Sat.1 (9 Matches per season, only on German language)
Bundesliga 2
SuperSport (2021/2025)
Sat.1 (only selected matches on German language)
Eredivisie: SuperSport (2016/2025)
Scottish Premiership: Oversport (2022/2025)
Primeira Liga: Tring Sport (2018/2023)
Süper Lig: K Sport (2017/2024)
TFF 1.Lig: TRT Spor (2020/2023)
Football Superleague of Kosovo 
ArtSport (2020/2023)
Klan Kosova (only one game per matchweek)
First Football League of Kosovo: ArtSport (2021/2023)
Second Football League of Kosovo: Regional Channels
Kategoria Superiore: Oversport (2022/2025)
Kategoria e Parë: Oversport (2022/2025)

Cups

UEFA Super Cup
ArtSport (2021-2023)
Klan Kosova
RTK (2024-2027)
FIFA Club World Cup: ArtSport (2021-2023)
Copa del Rey: Oversport (2022/2025) 
Supercopa de España: SuperSport (2018-2026)
Coppa Italia: ArtSport (2021/2024)
Supercoppa Italiana: ArtSport (2022-2024)
Coupe de France: SuperSport (2018-2026)
Trophée des Champions
ArtSport (2021-2023)
SuperSport (2022-2024)
DFB Pokal: ArtSport, SuperSport (2019/2025)
DFL Super Cup
SuperSport (2021-2024)
Sat.1 (only on German language)
FA Cup: SuperSport (2015/2024)
The FA Community Shield: SuperSport (2016-2024)
EFL Cup: ArtSport & SuperSport (2022/2024)
Scottish League Cup: Oversport (2022/2025)
Turkish Super Cup: TRT Spor
Kosovar Cup: ArtSport (2020/2023)
Kosovar Supercup: ArtSport (2020-2023)
Womens Kosovar Cup: ArtSport (2022 Final Only)
Kupa e Shqipërisë: Oversport (2022/2025)
Superkupa e Shqipërisë: Oversport (2022-2024)

Basketball
Kosovo Basketball Superleague
K Sport (2020/2024)
ArtSport (2018/2024)
Klan Kosova
Liga e Parë
K Sport (2020/2024)
ArtSport (2018/2024)
Liga Unike
K Sport
ArtSport
Klan Kosova
RTSH
Kosovo Women's Basketball Superleague
K Sport
ArtSport (2020/2024)
NBA
ArtSport (2019/2024)
Klan Kosova
NBA TV
NBA Summer League: NBA TV
WNBA: NBA TV
FIBA Champions League:FIBA YouTube channel
FIBA Europe Cup
ArtSport
K Sport 
Basketbol Süper Ligi: K Sport (2020/2023) Arena Sport (2022/2025)
Lega Basket Serie A: K Sport (2020/2023) Arena Sport  (2022/2025)
LNB Pro A: Arena Sport  (2022/2025)
Liga ACB: Arena Sport  (2022/2025)
Balkan League
ArtSport
K Sport
Euroleague: K Sport (2015/2023)
ABA League: ArtSport (2018/2023)

Basketball Cups

FIBA 3x3 Europe Cup: ArtSport
FIBA 3x3 World Cup: ArtSport
FIBA Intercontinental Cup: ArtSport
Kosovo Basketball Cup
K Sport (2020-2024)
ArtSport (2018-2024)
Klan Kosova
RTV Dukagjini (2022 Final Only)
 Kosovar Supercup
K Sport (2020-2024)
ArtSport (2018-2024)
Klan Kosova (Final Only)
Superkupa Mbarëkombëtare
ArtSport
K Sport
Italian Basketball Supercup: K Sport

Fight Sports
Bushido MMA: DAZN: October 2022 to October 2025, all fights
Dream Boxing: DAZN: October 2022 to October 2025, all fights
Enfusion: ArtSport
King of Kings: FightBox & DAZN: October 2022 to October 2025, all fights
One Championship: ArtSport (2018-2022)
UFC: SuperSport (2021-2023)
World Judo Championships: ArtSport (2018-2022)

Motosports
MotoGP: ArtSport (2018-2022)
Moto2 : ArtSport (2018-2022)
Moto3 : ArtSport (2018-2022)
Formula 1: ArtSport (2018–2022)
Formula 2: ArtSport (2018-2022)
Formula 3: ArtSport (2018-2022)
Indy Car: TBA
Formula E: Eurosport
Porsche Supercup : Eurosport
Pure ETCR: Eurosport
European Rally Championship: Eurosport
FIA WTCR: Eurosport
FIA WTCC: Eurosport
FIA World Endurance Championship: Eurosport
24 Hours of Le Mans: Eurosport
FIM EWC: Eurosport
FIM Speedway Grand Prix: Eurosport

Cycling

Vuelta a España: Eurosport 
Tour de France: Eurosport 
Giro d'Italia: Eurosport
Deutschland Tour: Eurosport
Tour of Britain: Eurosport
La Doyenne: Eurosport
Amstel Gold Race: Eurosport
Milan–San Remo: Eurosport
Giro di Lombardia: Eurosport
Paris–Roubaix: Eurosport
Tour of Denmark: Eurosport
Clásica de San Sebastián: Eurosport
Critérium du Dauphiné: Eurosport
La Flèche Wallonne: Eurosport
Tour of the Basque: Eurosport
Tour of Flanders: Eurosport
Tirreno–Adriatico: Eurosport
Benelux Tour: Eurosport
Tour de Luxembourg: Eurosport
Tour of Slovakia: Eurosport
Primus Classic: Eurosport
Giro di Sicilia: Eurosport
Eschborn–Frankfurt: Eurosport
Tour of Croatia: Eurosport
Tour of Turkey: Eurosport
Tour de Romandie: Eurosport
Four Days of Dunkirk: Eurosport
Critérium du Dauphiné: Eurosport
Brussels Cycling Classic: Eurosport
Tour of Norway: Eurosport
UCI Mountain Bike World Cup: Eurosport

Tennis
Australian Open: Eurosport (2012-2031)
Roland Garros: Eurosport (2012-2026)
US Open: Eurosport (2012-2022)
Laver Cup: Eurosport
Davis Cup: Eurosport
Adelaide International: Eurosport
Wimbledon
ArtSport
Klan Kosova (Final only)
K Sport (2021-2024)
SuperSport (2022-2025) (Only on EN lang.)
TRT Spor (Only on TR lang.)
WTA 250: K Sport (2020–Present)
WTA 500: K Sport (2020–Present)
WTA 1000: K Sport (2020–Present)
ATP 500: SuperSport (2020-2023)
ATP 1000: SuperSport (2020-2023)
ATP Finals: SuperSport (2020-2023)

Handball

EHF EURO 2024 Qualifiers: RTK (Only Kosovo's NT matches)

Volleyball
 
CEV EuroVolley 2021: Oversport
Kosovo Men's Super League: RTK (2021/2023)
Kosovo Women's Super League: RTK (2021/2023)
CEV EUROVOLLEY 2023 qualification: Oversport

Golf

PGA Tour: Eurosport

Snooker

Northern Ireland Open: Eurosport
English Open: Eurosport
UK Championship: Eurosport
World Championship: Eurosport

eSport 
 eSerie A: Oversport (2021/2024)
BLAST Premier: ArtSport

Athletics 
IAAF Diamond League: SuperSport
World Athletics Continental Tour: Oversport (2021-2024)
World Athletics Indoor Tour: Oversport (2021-2024)

Horse Riding 
Global Champions Tour: Eurosport

Squash 
PSA World Tour (2021-2024)
WSF World Tour (2021-2024)

See also 

 Television in Kosovo
 RTK
 ArtMotion
 ArtSport
 Kujtesa
 K Sport
 Tring 
 Tring Sport
 RTSH
 DigitAlb
 SuperSport

References

Kosovo
Sport in Kosovo